Borów may refer to the following places in Poland:
Gmina Borów in Lower Silesian Voivodeship
Borów, Polkowice County in Lower Silesian Voivodeship (south-west Poland)
Borów, Strzelin County in Lower Silesian Voivodeship (south-west Poland)
Borów, Świdnica County in Lower Silesian Voivodeship (south-west Poland)
Borów, Trzebnica County in Lower Silesian Voivodeship (south-west Poland)
Borów, Krasnystaw County in Lublin Voivodeship (east Poland)
Borów, Kraśnik County in Lublin Voivodeship (east Poland)
Borów, Gmina Grabów in Łódź Voivodeship (central Poland)
Borów, Gmina Łęczyca in Łódź Voivodeship (central Poland)
Borów, Łowicz County in Łódź Voivodeship (central Poland)
Borów, Opole Lubelskie County in Lublin Voivodeship (east Poland)
Borów, Świętokrzyskie Voivodeship (south-central Poland)
Borów, Masovian Voivodeship (east-central Poland)
Borów, Greater Poland Voivodeship (west-central Poland)
Borów, Lubusz Voivodeship (west Poland)